Toozaza Peak is a tuya in the Stikine Ranges of the Cassiar Mountains in northern British Columbia, Canada, located in the Iverson Creek. Toozaza Peak is the summit of a north–south aligned ridge between the head of Toozaza Creek and the  head of the Jennings River, just south of the Jennings' divide with the Little Rancheria River headwaters.  The Little Rancheria and Toozaza Creek are part of the Liard, while the Jennings is part of the  Yukon River drainage via Teslin Lake, and the peak therefore stands astride the line of the Continental Divide. It is part of the Tuya Volcanic Field, a volcanic field associated with the Stikine Volcanic Belt, part of the Northern Cordilleran Volcanic Province.

See also
 List of volcanoes in Canada
 List of Northern Cordilleran volcanoes
 Volcanism of Canada
 Volcanism of Western Canada

References

External links
 Toozaza Peak in the Canadian Mountain Encyclopedia
 

Volcanoes of British Columbia
Two-thousanders of British Columbia
Tuyas of Canada
Cassiar Country
Stikine Ranges
Pleistocene volcanoes
Monogenetic volcanoes
Great Divide of North America
Northern Cordilleran Volcanic Province